P. petiolaris may refer to:
 Pedicularis petiolaris, a species in the genus Pedicularis
 Pleurothallis petiolaris, a species in the genus Pleurothallis
 Pultenaea petiolaris, a species in the genus Pultenaea

See also
 Petiolaris (disambiguation)